"Get Up!" is the third solo single of the Japanese singer Yuma Nakayama. The theme of this single is to "give your all 'now'",  a strong positive message was conveyed in the song.

Release 
The single was released on September 10, 2014. Just like the single High Five, this single also has events. The first event is called Special Summer Event ～Get up & Come meet YUMA  and the other one was to be held in 2015 at Tokyo and Osaka.

Track listing 
Limited Edition 1 – Single (CD＋DVD)
CD
 "Get Up!"
 "Butterfly"
 "Get Up!(Original karaoke)"
 "Butterfly(Original karaoke)"

DVD
「Get Up!」Music Clip & Making

①2 face, 4 page jacket
②Nakayama Yuma Special Event ID

Limited Edition 2 – Single (CD＋DVD)

CD
 "Get Up!"
 "Butterfly"
 "Get Up!(Original karaoke)"
 "Butterfly(Original karaoke)"

DVD
「Butterfly」Music Clip & Making

①2 face, 4 page jacket
②Nakayama Yuma Special Event ID

Regular Edition – Single (CD)
 "Get Up!"
 "Butterfly"
 "Best Friend"
 "I say Goodbye"

①3 faced, 6 Page jacket
②"Best Friend" recorded(Regular edition)
③"I Say Goodbye" recorded (regular edition)
④Nakayama Yuma Special Event ID(First Press Release)

Event Limited Edition – Single (CD)
 "Get Up!"
 "Darkness"

①2 faced, 4 Page jacket

Charts and certifications

References

External links
 Get Up Johnnys net
  Get Up JEHP

2014 singles
2014 songs